The Paul Reiser Show is an American sitcom television series, centered around actor Paul Reiser, (as himself), that originally aired on NBC. In May 2010, NBC announced that it had approved the series for the 2010–11 television season, with the half-hour comedy expected to premiere as a midseason replacement. The series premiered on April 14, 2011, at 8:30 pm. Due to extremely low ratings, the program was canceled on April 22, 2011, after only two episodes. The series was produced by Warner Bros. Television.

Premise
The semi-autobiographical sitcom stars Paul Reiser as a former television star who has not worked on a television series in several years. While he has enjoyed spending quality time with his family during this break, he feels he needs something more. Deciding to shake up his life a bit, Reiser enlists his friends to help him find the next "big thing" to occupy his time.

Cast
Paul Reiser as Paul Reiser
Ben Shenkman as Jonathan
Omid Djalili as Habib
Duane Martin as Fernando
Andrew Daly as Brad
Amy Landecker as Claire, Paul's wife
Brock Waidmann as Zeke
Koby Rouviere as Gabe
Larry Dorf as Alex Gimple

Development and production
Reiser wrote the spec script for the untitled project, and first pitched the show to HBO, which turned it down. NBC ordered a pilot episode in February 2010. In early March, reports were referring to the project as Next. Amy Landecker was the first actor cast in late March, followed by Duane Martin in early April. Brock Waidmann, an actor with spina bifida, was selected to play the role of Reiser's son.  Immediately after the audition Reiser said, "I love this kid!" The next day they called him to offer the part.

NBC announced a pick-up of the series in mid-May. Also announced were the additions of Andrew Daly, Ben Shenkman, Brock Waidmann, Koby Rouviere and Omid Djalili to the cast.

Seven half-hour episodes were produced, all from scripts already written by Reiser and Jonathan Shapiro.

The series was introduced at the NBC upfront presentation with the new name The Paul Reiser Show. The show premiered on April 14, 2011, replacing Perfect Couples.

Reception
The show did not receive good ratings. The premiere episode received ratings lower than those for the premiere of Perfect Couples, the show it had replaced. Reuters reported that the show's premiere was "NBC's lowest rating ever for an in-season comedy premiere". The second episode's ratings dropped even further and the show was canceled shortly after. Amy Landecker said she first learned of the show's demise by doing an Internet search before getting an email confirming the show's official cancellation hours later.

The show was also negatively reviewed, with Metacritic reporting a rating of only 38 out of 100.  Emily VanDerWerff of The A.V. Club gave the show a D+, writing that it was best summarized by the word "complacent" and that "everything about it feels off-putting and weird". She compared it unfavorably to Curb Your Enthusiasm, calling it a "weird copycat" that "takes most of the trappings of Curb but misses almost all of the soul". Alan Pergament, the TV critic for The Buffalo News, also drew comparisons to Curb Your Enthusiasm (going so far as to call it a "direct steal") and to the drama Men of a Certain Age, but noted that Reiser's "good guy" personality was not as good a fit for the format as Larry David's arrogance was for Curb.

Episodes

References

External links

2010s American single-camera sitcoms
2011 American television series debuts
2011 American television series endings
English-language television shows
Cultural depictions of actors
NBC original programming
Metafictional television series
Television series by Warner Bros. Television Studios
Television shows set in Los Angeles